Sergeyevka is a rural locality (a selo) in Bala-Chetyrmansky Selsoviet, Fyodorovsky District, Bashkortostan, Russia. The population was 13 as of 2010. There is 1 street.

Geography 
Sergeyevka is located 35 km southeast of Fyodorovka (the district's administrative centre) by road. Novosofiyevka is the nearest rural locality.

References 

Rural localities in Fyodorovsky District